Jean Ces (5 September 1906 in Béziers – 25 December 1969) was a French bantamweight professional boxer who competed in the 1920s. He won a bronze medal in Boxing at the 1924 Summer Olympics in the bantamweight category, losing against Salvatore Tripoli in the semi-final.

References

External links

1906 births
1969 deaths
Sportspeople from Béziers
Bantamweight boxers
Boxers at the 1924 Summer Olympics
Olympic boxers of France
Olympic bronze medalists for France
Place of birth missing
Olympic medalists in boxing
French male boxers
Medalists at the 1924 Summer Olympics